Palotina is a Brazilian municipality in western Paraná state, located around 60 kilometers from the border with Paraguay.

Location

The population is 32,121 inhabitants, as of the 2020 estimate. Owing to highly fertile land, the city is a flourishing agricultural hub and a base for two major agricultural companies: C. Vale and I. Rieddi. Another highlight of Palotina is the campus of the Federal University of Paraná (UFPR). There is also one private university, the UESPAR (União de Ensino Superior do Paraná).

The municipality contains  the  São Camilo State Park, a conservation unit originally created as a biological reserve in 1990.

History

Settlement in the area started in 1953 when Pinho e Terras started to colonize the area. The settlement began to grow and on  July 25, 1960 attained the status of municipality. Pinho e Terras approach to colonization was called exemplary, but in the early 1960s the colonists were besieged by gunmen hired by the "new landowners" affiliated with state governor and Socialist Democratic Party boss Moises Lupion. The federal government moved in a regiment of border guards to pacify the area and in 1963 re-nationalized the disputed lands. The colonists had to buy back their own land.

The name of the municipality comes from Saint Vincent Pallotti, because some priests, who were members of the Society of Catholic Apostolate (SAC), were present during the colonization period. The priests of this society are kwnon to this day as "Pallotines"; hence, the name "Palotina" (feminine form, in portuguese, of "Pallottine"). Saint Vincent Pallotti is the patron saint of Palotina; a statue of his can be found in the central square of the municipality. The only parish in the municipality, which is made up only of Pallottine priests, is also named after the Saint: in portuguese, Paróquia São Vicente Pallotti. The parish belongs to the Diocese of Toledo.

The major part of the population is catholic.

Agriciltural economy of Palotina relies on production of corn, wheat and soybean. A 1969 survey placed Palotina in the cluster of most efficient agricultural communities in Brazil. According to authors of the study, higher productivity in this cluster stemmed from raising pigs, which accounts for 68% of its output. 82% of lands were allotted to fodder crops rather than traditional rice, bean and cotton.

Nowadays, Palotina is a near 30k inhabitants municipality with an agroindustrial economy and a hopeful future. Most of the population, around 68%, have Italian ancestry and about 13% of the community have German ancestry.

Climate
Humid subtropical climate of Palotina (Cfa in Köppen climate classification) is characterized by humid and hot summers, while winters are cool. Precipitation is moderate all year long.

Footnotes

References
 Joe Foweraker (2002). The Struggle for Land: A Political Economy of the Pioneer Frontier in Brazil from 1930 to the Present Day. Cambridge University Press. .

Further reading

 Pedro Reginato (1979). História de Palotina, 1954-1979 (in Portuguese). Pallotti.

Municipalities in Paraná